Bart Kofoed (born March 24, 1964) is a retired American professional basketball player. At 6'4" (1.93 m) he played as a small forward/shooting guard.

Kofoed attended Hastings College before transferring to Kearney State College (now University of Nebraska at Kearney), and was selected with the 15th pick of the fifth round of the 1987 NBA Draft by the Utah Jazz (107th overall). He played on four different NBA teams between 1987 and 1992. During the 1994–95 Continental Basketball Association season, Kofoed served as assistant coach to Omaha Racers head coach Mike Thibault.

Along with former NBA players Bobby Jones and David Thompson, Kofoed co-founded 2XSALT, a non-profit Christian organization based in Charlotte, North Carolina.

References

External links
Bart Kofoed bio @ 2xsalt.org
College & NBA stats @ Basketball-Reference.com

1964 births
Living people
American men's basketball players
Basketball coaches from Nebraska
Basketball players from Nebraska
Boston Celtics players
Continental Basketball Association coaches
Golden State Warriors players
Hastings Broncos men's basketball players
La Crosse Catbirds players
Nebraska–Kearney Lopers men's basketball players
Omaha Racers players
Rochester Flyers players
Seattle SuperSonics players
Shooting guards
Small forwards
Sportspeople from Omaha, Nebraska
Utah Jazz draft picks
Utah Jazz players
Yakima Sun Kings players